U.F.O.s is a 1997 adventure video game developed by Artech Digital Entertainment and published by Corel Corporation and Hoffmann + Associates on Macintosh and Windows.

Plot and gameplay
The player character is an alien named "Gnap", who gets stranded on earth due to his spaceship crash landing. Now he must find and repair his wrecked ship so he can return home.

The game is a comic adventure with themes aimed at a mature audience.

Production
The game was localised by ARI Data CD in Germany (1997), AIM Productions in Belgium (1998), and Akella in Russia (1998).

Reception
Tap Repeatedly felt it would be enjoyable only to adventure game fans. Metzomagic deemed the game amusing in a tasteless and offensive manner. Just Adventure compared the game's humour to that of Ren and Stimpy. Adventure archiv praised the cartoon-style graphics. Gambler felt it was a decent video game considering its limited budget. U.F.Os reminded Quandaryland of the video game Stupid Invaders.

References

External links 
 
 PC Joker review
 PC Joker review 2
 PC Joker review 3
 PC Player

1997 video games
Adventure games
Classic Mac OS games
Single-player video games
Video games about extraterrestrial life
Video games developed in Canada
Windows games
ScummVM-supported games
Akella games
Artech Studios games